Persparsia kopua, the spangled tubeshoulder, is a species of tubeshoulder found around the world in the southern hemisphere (apart from South America) between latitudes 30° S and 50° S and at depths of .  Its length is up to  TL. Persparsia kopua is a mesopelagic species.

References
 

Platytroctidae
Monotypic ray-finned fish genera
Fish described in 1951